The Northern Cape Department of Sport, Arts and Culture is the department of the Government of the Northern Cape, responsible for promoting, supporting, developing and protecting the arts, culture and sports of the Northern Cape. The political head of the department is the MEC (Member of the Executive Council); as of 2020 this position is held by Desery Finies.

References

External links
Official website

Government of the Northern Cape
South African culture
Sport in South Africa
Northern Cape
Northern Cape